The 4th Gujarat Legislative Assembly election was held in 1972.  Indian National Congress won 140 seats out of 168 seats. While, NCO won 16 seats. Congress performed better in this election and gained 47 seats. 

Total of 852 men and 21 women contested the election. Total 167 men and 1 woman won in the elections. The number of polling stations was 17,994 and the number of electors per polling station was 695.

Results

Elected members

References

State Assembly elections in Gujarat
1970s in Gujarat
Gujarat